In July 2016, the International Union for Conservation of Nature (IUCN) listed 1080 vulnerable arthropod species. Of all evaluated arthropod species, 11% are listed as vulnerable. 
The IUCN also lists 29 arthropod subspecies as vulnerable.

No subpopulations of arthropods have been evaluated by the IUCN.

For a species to be assessed as vulnerable to extinction the best available evidence must meet quantitative criteria set by the IUCN designed to reflect "a high risk of extinction in the wild". Endangered and critically endangered species also meet the quantitative criteria of vulnerable species, and are listed separately. See: List of endangered arthropods, List of critically endangered arthropods. Vulnerable, endangered and critically endangered species are collectively referred to as threatened species by the IUCN.

Additionally 2875 arthropod species (30% of those evaluated) are listed as data deficient, meaning there is insufficient information for a full assessment of conservation status. As these species typically have small distributions and/or populations, they are intrinsically likely to be threatened, according to the IUCN. While the category of data deficient indicates that no assessment of extinction risk has been made for the taxa, the IUCN notes that it may be appropriate to give them "the same degree of attention as threatened taxa, at least until their status can be assessed".

This is a complete list of vulnerable arthropod species and subspecies as evaluated by the IUCN.

Seed shrimps

Arachnids
There are 47 arachnid species assessed as vulnerable.

Spiders

Other arachnid species

Branchiopoda

Millipedes

Maxillopoda
Maxillopoda includes barnacles, copepods and a number of related animals. There are 71 species in the class Maxillopoda assessed as vulnerable.

Calanoida
There are 47 species in the order Calanoida assessed as vulnerable.

Diaptomids

Centropagids

Temorids
Epischura baikalensis

Cyclopoida

Harpacticoida
There are 18 species in the order Harpacticoida assessed as vulnerable.

Darcythompsoniids
Leptocaris stromatolicolus

Ameirids
Nitocrella slovenica
Nitocrella stochi

Canthocamptids

Malacostracans
Malacostraca includes crabs, lobsters, crayfish, shrimp, krill, woodlice, and many others. There are 307 malacostracan species and 14 malacostracan subspecies assessed as vulnerable.

Isopods
Species

Subspecies

Amphipods
There are 56 amphipod species and four amphipod subspecies assessed as vulnerable.

Hadziids
Subspecies
Hadzia fragilis stochi

Paramelitids
Paramelita flexa

Gammarids

Crangonyctids

Niphargids
Species

Subspecies

Anaspidacea

Decapods
There are 224 decapod species and seven decapod subspecies assessed as vulnerable.

Parastacids

Gecarcinucids

Atyids

Cambarids
Species

Subspecies

Potamonautids

Pseudothelphusids

Potamids

Palaemonids

Trichodactylids

Other decapod species

Insects
There are 608 insect species and 15 insect subspecies assessed as vulnerable.

Flies

Plecoptera
Otway stonefly (Eusthenia nothofagi)
Mount Kosciusko wingless stonefly (Leptoperla cacuminis)

Notoptera
Mount St Helens' grylloblattid (Grylloblatta chirurgica)

Orthoptera
There are 137 species in the order Orthoptera assessed as vulnerable.

Crickets

Acridids

Stenopelmatids

Tettigoniids

Rhaphidophorids

Phaneropterids

Other Orthoptera species

Hymenoptera
There are 155 species in the order Hymenoptera assessed as vulnerable.

Ants

Colletids

Melittids
Melitta hispanica
Melitta kastiliensis

Apids

Megachilids
Wallace's giant bee (Megachile pluto)

Mantises

Lepidoptera
Lepidoptera comprises moths and butterflies. There are 128 species and ten subspecies in the order Lepidoptera assessed as vulnerable.

Lasiocampids
Small lappet moth (Phyllodesma ilicifolia)

Swallowtail butterflies

Lycaenids

Nymphalids
Species

Subspecies

Skippers
Dakota skipper (Hesperia dacotae)
Cinquefoil skipper (Pyrgus cirsii)

Pierids

Beetles
There are 50 beetle species assessed as vulnerable.

Dytiscids

Longhorn beetles

Scarabaeids

Other beetle species

Odonata
Odonata includes dragonflies and damselflies. There are 129 species and five subspecies in the order Odonata assessed as vulnerable.

Chlorogomphids

Chlorocyphids

Platycnemidids

Megapodagrionids

Gomphids
Species

Subspecies
Erpetogomphus lampropeltis lampropeltis

Coenagrionids
Species

Subspecies

Aeshnids

Libellulids

Other Odonata species

Other arthropod species

See also 
 Lists of IUCN Red List vulnerable species
 List of least concern arthropods
 List of near threatened arthropods
 List of endangered arthropods
 List of critically endangered arthropods
 List of recently extinct arthropods
 List of data deficient arthropods

References 

Arthropods
Vulnerable arthropods
Vulnerable arthropods
Arthropod conservation